The Tongju Yang clan was a Korean clan. Their bon-gwan was in Tongzhou District, Beijing, China. According to research in 2000, members of the clan numbered 83. After that, Crown Prince Sohyeon returned to Joseon with nine people who were captured by the Qing dynasty after the Qing invasion of Joseon. They hoped for the Ming dynasty's restoration and raised a rebellion but were detained by the Qing dynasty.

See also 
 Korean clan names of foreign origin

References

External links 
 

 
Korean clan names of Chinese origin